The West Seattle Herald is a newspaper serving West Seattle, Seattle, Washington. Since 2013, it has been a part of Westside Seattle.

History
The West Seattle Herald was founded in 1923.

In 2013, Robinson Newspapers made the West Seattle Herald part of The Westside Weekly, along with the Ballard News-Tribune, the Highline Times, and White Center News. The Westside Weekly was renamed to Westside Seattle in June 2017.

In 2014, Amanda Knox began writing for the paper.

On April 30, 2021, Westside Seattle (which the West Seattle Herald was part of) published its final print issue while maintaining an online presence.

References

External links
 Official website
 Robinson News

Newspapers published in Seattle
Newspapers established in 1923